Akkent (former Zeyve) is a town in Çal district of Denizli Province, Turkey. The population of Akkent was 2382 as of 2012. The settlement was probably founded during the Germiyan Beylik era in 13th century. In 1932 the settlement was declared a seat of township. Orcharding is the major economic sector of the town. There is also a factory based on agricultural products.

References

Towns in Turkey
Villages in Çal District